A blue giant is a hot star with a luminosity class of III (giant) or II (bright giant).

Blue giant may also refer to:

 Blue Giant (band), a band from Portland, Oregon
 Blue Giant Equipment Corporation, a loading dock equipment manufacturer
 Blue Giant (manga), a Japanese manga series by Shinichi Ishizuka

See also

Agastache foeniculum, a plant species also known as blue giant hyssop
 Blue star (disambiguation)
 Blue dwarf (disambiguation)